Arlene Istar Lev is a North American clinical social worker, family therapist, and educator.  She is an independent scholar, who has lectured internationally on topics related to sexual orientation and gender identity, sexuality, and LGBTQ families.

She has been a lecturer at the School of Social Welfare at the State University of New York at Albany since 1988, and is the founder and Project Director of its Sexual Orientation and Gender Identity Project. Additionally she has been an adjunct professor at Smith College of Social Work, Empire College, Rockway Institute, California School of Professional Psychology at Alliant International University, Excelsior College, Vermont College, and the Union Institute and University.

Arlene Lev has been a practicing psychotherapist and family therapist, and is the founder and Clinical Director of Choices Counseling and Consulting in Albany, New York. She is the author of the groundbreaking book Transgender Emergence: Therapeutic Guidelines for Working with Gender-Variant People and their Families, as well as The Complete Lesbian and Gay Parenting Guide.

Early life and education
Arlene Lev (née Weinstein) was born and raised in Brooklyn, New York. to a working class Jewish family. She is an only child and was raised partially by her single mother (Mindy), and partially by her grandparents (Ethel and Sam Brown).

She received her associate degree in 1975 from Herkimer County Community College and bachelor's degree in Sociology in 1979 from Binghamton University. In 1986 she graduated from the University at Albany with a Master of Social Work degree.

Career
In 1986 Lev founded Choices Counseling and Consulting, Albany, New York area Capital District to specialize in working with lesbian and gay individuals, couples and families. She is the Clinical Director of the practice which currently focuses on lesbian, gay, bisexual, transgender, queer individuals (LGBTQ) clients and their families. The practice has a goal of keeping therapy affordable for a community that often has suffered from economic hardships. Grounded in feminist family therapy, therapeutic services are directed towards empowerment and authenticity and the nurturing of healthy queer families. In recent years, Choices Counseling and Consulting has expanded, with a staff of 8, as well as working with social work and psychology interns from various local colleges. Lev is also a CASAC (Crediential Alcoholism and Substance Abuse Counselor).

In 2000 Lev founded the Rainbow Access Initiative, a training program on LGBT issues for therapists and medical professionals in the Capital Region of New York. She was the first Project Director and wrote the original proposal for the project which was funded through grants from the New York State Department of Health. She served as Project Manager from 2000 through 2004 and Lead Trainer & Consultant from 2000 through 2008.

As Lev began to work with transgender clients and their families in the mid-1980s, she realized that her training had prepared her inadequately for dealing with the issues in sexuality, sexual practices and gender that she encountered. In 2004, after many years of working in this field, she published her first book, Transgender Emergence: Therapeutic Guidelines for Working with Gender-Variant People and their Families. In 2006 the book won an American Psychological Association (Division 44) Distinguished Book Award for its large contribution to a sparsely covered area, and for being "filled with clinical wisdom and understanding." The book was also chosen as a 2006 book of "Exceptional Merit" by the Society for Sex Therapy and Research. The book is encyclopedic and became required reading for social workers and mental health counselors working with transgender people. It was called groundbreaking for outlining the shift toward a collaborative model of treatment.

Lev is Project Director of the Sexual Orientation and Gender Identity Project (SOGI), which was formed in 2009 to "Enhance the clinical skills of graduate students working with lesbian, gay, bisexual, transgender, queer individuals (LGBTQ) clients and their families, as well as develop educational and campus-wide access for students across disciplines who are interested in LGBTQ studies." Lev was key in the formation of this program as part of her work as an independent scholar which was honored by the university in May 2011. Lev was also honored in 2014 with the President's Award for Exemplary Community Engagement.

In 2010 Lev founded TIGRIS: The Institute for Gender, Relationships, Identity, and Sexuality, a post-graduate training program in Albany, New York. She serves as Training Director.

Lev is the clinical supervisor for The Pride Center of the Capital Region's internship program through the University of Albany's School of Social Welfare Social Work Program.

Lev is on the board of directors of the American Family Therapy Academy, and she currently serves on the editorial boards of  The Journal of GLBT Family Studies, and The International Journal of Transgender Health. Lev is also a member of the World Professional Association for Transgender Health and worked on developing the 7th edition of the Standards of Care.

Personal life
She is an out lesbian.

Awards
 University at Albany, President's Aware for Exemplary Community Engagement, 2014
 Innovative Contribution to Family Therapy,'''', American Family Therapy Academy, 2013.
 Ally Award, Freedom Center for Social Justice, TransFaith in Color Conference, 2011
  Unsung Hero Award from the university at Albany,  Lavender Graduation, 2010.
 Community Service Aware, Capital District Gay and Lesbian Community Council, 2010
 Transgender Emergence" won The American Psychological Association, Division 44, as Distinguished Book of the Year, 2006.
 "Transgender Emergence" chosen by The Society of Sex Therapy and Research as Book of Special Merit, 2006.
 "Positive Difference Award", The Office of Learning Disabled Students Services Department of Student LIfe, University at Albany, 2003.

Selected publications

Books

Book chapters
 Lev, A.I. (in press). Understanding Transgender Identities and Exploring Sexuality and Desire. In Allex, G.H. (Ed). "Sexual Diversity and Sexual Offending. Research, Assessment and Clinical Treatment in Psychosexual Therapy. London: Kamac.
 Lev, A.I. (in press). Resilience in Lesbian and Gay Couples. In K. Skerrett, K. & K. Fergus (Eds). 2014.  Couple resilience across the lifespan: Emerging perspectives. New York: Springer Press.
 Lev, A.I., & Sennott, S. (2013). Clinical Work with LGBT Parents and Prospective Parents. In A. Goldberg & K. R. Allen (Eds) LGBT-Parent Families: Possibilities for New Research and Implications for Practice. New York: Springer Press.
 Lev, A.I. & Sennott, S. (2012). Trans-sexual Desire in Different Gendered Bodies. In J.J. Bigner & J.L. Wetchler (Eds.), Handbook of LGBT-Affirmative Couple and Family Therapy.  NY: Taylor & Francis.
 Lev, A.I., & Sennott, S. (2012). Understanding Gender Nonconformity and Transgender Identity: A Sex Positive Approach, In P. Kleinplatt’s (Ed.) New Directions in Sex Therapy (2nd Edition), NY: Routledge Press.
 Kleinplatz, P.J., Moser, C., & Lev, A.I (in press). Sex and Gender Identity Disorders. In G. Stricker & Tom Widiger, (Eds.), Clinical Psychology (Vol. 8) Handbook of Psychology (2nd Edition). Hoboken, NJ: Wiley & Sons.
 Lev, A.I (2007). Understanding Sexual Orientation and Gender Identity: The need for education in servicing victims of trauma. In Encyclopedia of Domestic Violence, (Ed.) Nicky Ali Jackson, Ph.D. NY: Routledge.
 Lev, A.I. (2006). Transgender Communities: Developing Identity through Connection In Bieschke, K., Perez, R. & DeBord, K. (Eds.). Handbook of Counseling and Psychotherapy with Lesbian, Gay, and Bisexual Clients (2nd Ed). American Psychological Association, Washington, D.C., 147-175.
 Lev, A.I. (2006). Transgender Emergence within Families. Sexual orientation and gender identity in social work practice. Morrow, D.F, & Messinger, L. (Eds.) NY: Columbia University Press, 263-283.
 Lev, A. Lev, S. (1999). Sexual Assault in the Lesbian, Gay, Bisexual and Transgendered Communities in. Joan C. McClennen & J. Gunther (Eds.) A Professional Guide to Understanding Gay and Lesbian Domestic Violence: Understanding Practice Interventions. Lewiston NY: Edwin Mellen Press, 35–62.
  [Monograph also published in journal format.]

Journal articles

 
 Coleman, E., Bockting, W., Botzer, M., CohenKettenis, P., DeCuypere, G., Feldman, J., Fraser, L., Green, J., Knudson, G., Meyer, W., Monstrey, S., Adler, R., Brown, G., Devor, A., Ehrbar, R., Ettner, R., Eyler, E., Garofalo, R., Karasic, D., Lev, A.I ., Mayer, G., MeyerBahlburg, H., Hall, B. P., Pfaefflin, F., Rachlin, K., Robinson, B., Schechter, L., Tangpricha, V., van Trotsenburg, M., Vitale, A., Winter, S., Whittle, S., Wylie, K., & Zucker, K. (2011). Standards of Care for the health of transsexual, transgender, and gender nonconforming people, 7th Version, International Journal of Transgender Health. http://wpath.org.
 
 
 Lev, A., Winters, K., Alie, L., Ansara, Y., Deutsch, M., Dickey, L., Ehrbar, R., Ehrensaft, D., Green, J., Meier, S., Richmond, K., Samons, S., Susset, F., (2010). “Response to Proposed DSM-5 Diagnostic Criteria,” Professionals Concerned with Gender Diagnoses in the DSM'Italic text, https://web.archive.org/web/20160422030121/http://professionals.gidreform.org/.
 
 
 
 
 
 
 
 
 
 
 Lev, A., Winters, K., Alie, L., Ansara, Y., Deutsch, M., Dickey, L., Ehrbar, R., Ehrensaft, D., Green, J., Meier, S., Richmond, K., Samons, S., Susset, F., (2010). “Response to Proposed DSM-5 Diagnostic Criteria,” Professionals Concerned With Gender Diagnoses in the DSM,.[16]

References

External links
 Curriculum vitae
 Choices Counseling & Consulting

Year of birth missing (living people)
Living people
American LGBT rights activists
Family therapists
American social workers
University at Albany, SUNY alumni
American substance abuse counselors
Binghamton University alumni
Lesbian Jews
American lesbian writers
21st-century American LGBT people
21st-century American women writers